Aristidis Vlassis (1947 – 26 May 2015) was a Greek painter and engraver.

Early years 
Vlassis was born and raised in Heraklion, where he was tutored in painting by Androgeos Alexandridis.

Career 
Vlassis lived in Heraklion until 1994, then moved to Athens, where he lived and worked until his death. Human beings and all aspects of their life are a central theme in his creations. He presented 23 solo exhibitions and participated in 16 group exhibitions. His works are displayed in several galleries and institutions such as the Greek National Gallery, the Municipal Art Gallery of Heraklion, the Vorres Museum, the Cultural Foundation of the National Bank, the Teloglion Foundation, the Technical University of Crete, the Pancretan Cooperative Bank, etc., as well as many private collections in Greece, France and Belgium.

References

External links
 Από ένα δωμάτιο που έβλεπε τοίχο είδε τον κόσμο ολόκληρο
 Απεβίωσε ο διακεκριμένος ζωγράφος Αριστείδης Βλάσσης

Greek painters
Artists from Heraklion
1947 births
2015 deaths
20th-century Greek painters
21st-century Greek painters